Jane Walker may refer to:
 Jane Harriett Walker, English medical doctor
 Jane Brotherton Walker, expert in the field of tick taxonomy
 Jane Walker Burleson, née Walker, socialite, artist, and Texan suffragette
 Jane Walker (charity founder) MBE, UK expat creating fashion from rubbish in the Philippines.